Seven Days or 7 Days may refer to:
 Week, an amount of time

Film
 7 Days (2010 film) (Les 7 jours du talion), Canadian thriller film
 7 Days (2021 film), American romantic comedy film
 Seven Days (1925 film), American silent film
 Seven Days (2007 film), South Korean crime thriller film
 Seven Days, also known as Shiva, 2008 film by Ronit Elkabetz and her brother Shlomi

Television
 7 Days (Irish TV programme), focusing on current affairs
 7 Days (New Zealand game show), focusing on comedy
 Seven Days (TV series), an American television series about time travel
 This Hour Has Seven Days, a Canadian television newsmagazine

Newspapers
 Seven Days (newspaper), a Vermont newspaper
 Zibn teg, a weekly Yiddish literary newspaper

Magazine
 Seven Days (magazine), a left-leaning alternative news magazine, 1976–79
 7 Days, a weekly magazine focused on the New York arts and entertainment scene, 1988–1990

Music
 7 Days (mixtape), a mixtape by Krept and Konan
 Seven Days (EP), a 2017 EP by PartyNextDoor

Songs
 "7 Days" (Craig David song), 2000
 "7 Days" (Adriana Evans song), 2004
 "Seven Days" (Mary J. Blige song), 1998
 "Seven Days" (Sting song), 1993
 "Seven Days", a song by Bob Dylan, which appears on The Bootleg Series Volumes 1–3 (Rare & Unreleased) 1961–1991
 "Seven Days", a song by Chumbawamba on their album Tubthumper
 "Seven Days", a song by Corrosion of Conformity on their album Deliverance
 "Seven Days", a song by Level 42 on the album True Colours (Level 42 album)

Other
 Seven Days (play), a 1909 play by Avery Hopwood and Mary Roberts Rinehart
7 Days Inn, Chinese budget hotel chain
 Seven Days (manga), a 2007 Japanese manga series written by Venio Tachibana and illustrated by Rihito Takarai
 7DAYS, a product line of the Greek bakery company Chipita

See also
 Seven Days Battles, an American Civil War battle
 Seven Day Jesus, a Contemporary Christian rock band
 Seven Days in May, a 1964 political thriller novel written by Fletcher Knebel and Charles W. Bailey
 "Seven Day Mile", a 1999 song by the Irish band The Frames
 Seven Days... Seven Nights, a 1960 French film
 Seven-Day War (disambiguation)